Linxi may refer to: 

 Albert Leung, an award-winning cantopop lyricist

China
 Linxi County, Hebei (临西县)
 Linxi County, Inner Mongolia (林西县)
Towns
 Linxi, Anhui (临溪镇), in Jixi County
 Linxi, Xingtai (临西镇), seat of Linxi County, Hebei
 Linxi, Tangshan (林西镇), in Yutian County, Hebei